Oscar Jairo Arboleda (born 20 September 1947) is a Colombian former footballer who played as an attacking midfielder.

Career
Born in Tuluá, Arboleda played for Deportivo Pereira, Deportivo Cali, Portuguesa, Cristal Caldas and Deportes Quindío.

He made 7 international appearances for Colombia, between 1975 and 1976.

References

1947 births
Living people
Colombian footballers
Colombia international footballers
Deportivo Pereira footballers
Deportivo Cali footballers
Portuguesa F.C. players
Once Caldas footballers
Deportes Quindío footballers
Categoría Primera A players
Association football midfielders
Colombian expatriate footballers
Colombian expatriate sportspeople in Venezuela
Expatriate footballers in Venezuela
Sportspeople from Valle del Cauca Department